The 2019–20 season was Colchester United's 83rd season in their history and their fourth successive season competing in League Two. Along with competing in League Two, the club participated in the FA Cup, EFL Cup and EFL Trophy.

In a season that was severely disrupted by the COVID-19 pandemic, Colchester reached the play-offs after the season was drawn to an early close. The U's occupied a play-off spot when the season was postponed on 13 March 2020. The campaign officially ended on 9 June following a vote by all League Two member clubs. Final league positions were determined on a points-per-game basis, and Colchester's 1.57 points-per-game was enough to secure sixth position in the league and the third of four play-off spots.

In their play-off semi-final first leg with Exeter City, the U's won 1–0 at home, but lost 3–2 on aggregate following a 3–1 extra time defeat at St James Park.

Colchester equalled their best-ever performance in the EFL Cup, reaching the quarter-finals. After dispatching of League Two rivals Swindon Town in the first round, the U's travelled to Premier League Crystal Palace in round two. Their resolute defending took the tie to a penalty shoot-out which they won 5–4. In the third round, Colchester hosted further Premier League opposition, with Tottenham Hotspur visiting the Colchester Community Stadium. Again, Colchester's staunched defending took the tie to penalties and they went on to win 4–3. In the fourth round, Colchester beat league rivals Crawley Town 3–1 to set up a trip to Old Trafford to take on Manchester United. Three second-half goals were enough for the home side to seal a convincing victory.

In the EFL Trophy, Colchester won their first group with wins over Gillingham and local rivals Ipswich Town, but were defeated in the second round by Stevenage.

Colchester's FA Cup campaign ended in the first round with a home defeat by League One side Coventry City.

Season overview

Preseason
Colchester's place in League Two for the 2019–20 season was confirmed on the final day of the 2018–19 season on 4 May 2019 after a dramatic late goal for Newport County ensured they finished ahead of the U's in seventh place achieving a place in the play-offs.

The club announced the first departures of the close season on 14 May when twelve under-23 and Academy graduates were not offered new deals. These players included David Agboola, Aaron Barnes, George Brown, Ken Charles, Noah Chesmain, Chris Forino, Arjanit Krasniqi, Eoin McKeown, Paul Rooney, Decarrey Sheriff, Sam Warde, and Will Wright.

On 17 May, young midfielder Kwame Poku signed his first professional contract, joining United from Worthing following a successful trial at the end of the 2018–19 season.

On 20 May, Colchester announced that all out of contract players had been offered new deals, except for forward Mikael Mandron, who was allowed to leave the club after two years and 95 appearances, and winger Ryan Gondoh, who had spent the end of last season on loan at Halifax Town.

Brennan Dickenson opted against signing a new contract with Colchester, instead signing for newly promoted League One club Milton Keynes Dons on 30 May.

On 7 June, Colchester announced the signing of former Leicester City under-23 midfielder Sammie McLeod on a two-year contract, joining from Maldon & Tiptree to link up with the U's under-23 side.

On 11 June, forward Junior Ogedi-Uzokwe, who had been on loan at Derry City until 1 June, had his contract extended by a further year after Colchester activated a clause in his contract. He would remain on loan with Derry until the end of the 2019 League of Ireland Premier Division season on 19 November.

Long-serving defender Tom Eastman agreed a two-year contract extension on 13 June.

On 18 June, Colchester signed former VfB Stuttgart defender Danny Collinge on a two-year contract.

Sam Saunders ended his short association with the club on 21 June by announcing his retirement from playing at the age of 35.

After making 141 appearances for the club, defender Frankie Kent left Colchester to sign for League One Peterborough United for an undisclosed fee on 22 June.

On 26 June, Colchester signed Malta international winger Luke Gambin on a two-year contract from Luton Town.

Sammie Szmodics ended a 16-year association with Colchester United on 28 June when he signed for Championship side Bristol City on a three-year deal in an undisclosed compensation deal after his U's contract had expired.

On 1 July, Colchester made several movements in the transfer market. First, they announced Diaz Wright had signed a one-year contract extension with the club. Then, winger Michael Fernandes arrived from Farnborough on a two-year deal, Next, it was announced goalkeeper coach and player Rene Gilmartin had opted to leave the U's to join Bristol City, before announcing the signing of Colchester-born Yeovil Town defender Omar Sowunmi on a two-year contract for an undisclosed fee.

On 2 July, Colchester announced that TEXO Scaffolding would be the new front of home shirt sponsors for kits for the next three seasons. Later the same day, the club announced the signing of Denmark youth international Matthew Weaire from Brighton & Hove Albion on a two-year contract.

On 3 July, Luke Ige arrived from Aston Villa on a one-year contract to join up with the Under-23 squad.

On 4 July, Colchester made a double signing with Cambridge United forward Jevani Brown arriving on a two-year contract for an undisclosed fee, while Paris Cowan-Hall later arrived at the club following his release from Wycombe Wanderers. The winger also signed a two-year deal with the U's.

Colchester started their pre-season friendlies with a game at Isthmian League Premier Division side Bowers & Pitsea on 5 July where they ran out 2–0 winners. The second-half goals were scored by Louis Dunne and Luke Norris.

In the U's second pre-season friendly on 9 July, they took on Dulwich Hamlet of the National League South. Colchester again won 2–0, with second-half goals from Courtney Senior and summer signing Omar Sowunmi.

On 13 July, Dean Gerken signed for Colchester following his release from Ipswich Town at the end of the 2018–19 season. He had been training with the U's and signed ahead of their friendly with Cefn Druids the same day.

New signing Gerken played the opening 45-minutes as the U's beat the Welsh side 3–0 with goals from Andre Hasanally in the first half, and Omar Sowunmi and Luke Norris in the second half.

On 16 July, Colchester won 3–0 at Wealdstone with goals coming from three new signings; Paris Cowan-Hall, Michael Fernandes and Luke Gambin.

On 19 July, young winger Todd Miller left the club to join Premier League side Brighton & Hove Albion, with the U's expected to receive compensation for the teenager. The same day, in their first home friendly of pre-season, Colchester suffered a 5–0 defeat to neighbours and rivals Ipswich Town. The visitors led 1–0 going into half-time, with four goals arriving in the second-half.

After turning down a new contract with the club, goalkeeper Dillon Barnes signed for Championship club Queens Park Rangers on a two-year contract on 22 July.

On 23 July, Charlton Athletic won 2–1 with a late goal in the U's latest pre-season friendly after Luke Norris had handed the home side the lead early in the second-half.

In Colchester's final pre-season friendly, Luke Norris scored again to secure a late 1–1 draw with Dover Athletic on 27 July.

August
On the eve of the season opener against Port Vale, Colchester signed former Arsenal left-back Cohen Bramall on a two-year contract.

Colchester were held to a 1–1 draw by Port Vale at the Colchester Community Stadium on 3 August. The visitors took the lead through a Tom Pope penalty in the fifth minute, but the U's equalised through Luke Norris on the stroke of half-time.

Plymouth Argyle hosted the U's on 10 August and won 1–0 with a second-half goal from Antoni Sarcevic.

The U's earned their first victory of the season on 13 August in their EFL Cup first round tie with Swindon Town. On the back of a goalless first-half, both teams had a man sent off for violent conduct in the 62nd-minute, with Cohen Bramall shown red for Colchester and Jerry Yates for Swindon. Tom Eastman broke the deadlock in the 77th-minute, before substitute Courtney Senior doubled the lead in the second minute of injury time. Fellow substitute Brandon Comley added a third in the seventh minute of injury time to complete the 3–0 victory and see the U's reach the second round for the first time since 2010.

On 17 August, Colchester hosted Cambridge United in the league. A ninth minute Luke Norris penalty gave the U's a 1–0 lead going into the interval, but two Cambridge goals in the second-half left Colchester to a 2–1 defeat.

Ipswich Town confirmed the signing of Kane Vincent-Young on 19 August for an undisclosed fee reportedly in the region of £500,000. He left the U's to sign a four-year deal with Town with the option of a further year.

Colchester continued their winless run with another second-half collapse against Grimsby Town on 20 August. Frank Nouble and Luke Norris had given the U's a 2–0 first-half lead, but goals for Grimsby in the 48th and 87th-minutes succumbed them to a draw and more dropped points.

On 24 August, the U's picked up their first league win of the season, beating Northampton Town 1–0 courtesy of a Luke Norris penalty, who racked up his fourth goal in five league matches.

In the second round of the EFL Cup on 27 August, Colchester travelled to Premier League Crystal Palace. Following a goalless 90-minutes, the match went to a penalty shoot-out. Andros Townsend stepped up to take the first penalty for the hosts, but his effort was saved by Dean Gerken in the U's goal. Each of the following penalties were scored by their takers, and U's Academy product Noah Chilvers converted the decisive spot kick to send Colchester through to the third round and their first win in the League Cup against top-flight opponents since 1979.

On 28 August, Colchester signed young Bristol City striker Freddie Hinds on loan until January.

On 29 August, the U's signed another striker with the arrival of Southend United's Theo Robinson on loan until January.

After making his first-team debut on the opening weekend of the season, Andre Hasanally signed his first professional contract with the club on 30 August, signing until June 2022.

Colchester rounded out August with a 1–0 win at Oldham Athletic on 31 August. Frank Nouble's strike on the stroke of half-time proved to be the difference between the sides.

September
On 2 September, transfer deadline day, Colchester signed young Charlton Athletic midfielder Brendan Sarpong-Wiredu on loan until January, with injuries ruling out Tom Lapslie, Harry Pell and Diaz Wright, and with Brandon Comley and Luke Gambin on international duty.

Sarpong-Wiredu and Kwame Poku both made their debuts on 3 September in Colchester's 3–2 EFL Trophy win against Gillingham. Paris Cowan-Hall scored his first goal for the U's after just eight minutes, before Gillingham equalised. Theo Robinson then scored his first goal for the club after 55-minutes to put the visitors back in front, before Cowan-Hall recorded his second goal of the evening to put Colchester 3–1 up. Former U's player Mikael Mandron pulled a goal back for Gillingham but Colchester held on for victory.

On 5 September, Colchester signed former loanee winger Callum Harriott on a two-year contract following his release from Reading during the summer.

On 7 September, Colchester were held to a goalless draw by Walsall at the Community Stadium.

On 14 September, Colchester were beaten 1–0 at Forest Green Rovers following a Luke Prosser own goal.

Colchester returned to winning ways on 17 September with another 3–0 win against Swindon Town, on this occasion away in the league. Tom Eastman opened the scoring in first-half injury time before a Theo Robinson brace sealed the win.

On 21 September, Colchester won 2–1 at home to Leyton Orient. Kwame Poku scored his debut professional goal after just three minutes, before Ryan Jackson doubled the U's lead in the 28th-minute. Conor Wilkinson pulled a goal back for the visitors just after half-time but Colchester held on to move them up to tenth in the League Two table.

Colchester drew their biggest crowd of the season of 9,481 when they hosted Premier League side Tottenham Hotspur in the third round of the EFL Cup on 24 September. Colchester had last reached the third round in the 2004–05 campaign. Colchester were dominated by the opposition for much of the game, registering just four shots and none on target while Spurs had 75 per cent possession. Despite this, a resilient U's side held on for 90-minutes with the tie ending goalless and going on to a penalty shoot-out. Dean Gerken in the Colchester goal saved the first penalty from Christian Eriksen, and despite Jevani Brown's poor Panenka penalty kick keeping the score level overall, Lucas Moura hit the bar only for Tom Lapslie to score the winning penalty for the U's. This put them through to the fourth round for the first time since the 1974–75 when they reached the quarter-finals.

The U's returned to league action on 28 September, drawing 1–1 at Macclesfield Town. Theo Robinson scored Colchester's goal, his fourth of the season.

October
On 5 October, Colchester started the month with a 3–1 win against League Two's bottom club Stevenage. The visitors opened the scoring with a first-half deflected goal, but Tom Eastman equalised shortly after the break. It wasn't until the 82nd-minute that the U's took the lead after Frank Nouble had been fouled in the penalty area and he stepped up to convert the spot kick. A minute later, he turned provider for Kwame Poku to score his second Colchester goal and seal the victory.

After beating the Tottenham Hotspur first-team in the EFL Cup, Colchester hosted their under-21 side in the EFL Trophy group stage. A Luke Norris headed goal put Colchester ahead on 44 minutes, but the visitors equalised 15-minutes from full-time through Tashan Oakley-Boothe. The game ended 1–1 and the match went to a penalty shoot-out, which Spurs won to claim a bonus point.

On 11 October, teenage defender Ollie Kensdale joined National League South side Bath City in a month-long loan deal.

Colchester visited Crawley Town on 12 October, and despite taking a first half lead through Luke Prosser, the home side scored twice in the second half to claim victory.

On 18 October, Noah Chilvers joined Ollie Kensdale at Bath City in a month-long loan deal.

On 19 October, Colchester suffered their second successive defeat, on this occasion a 1–0 reverse against League Two's bottom side Morecambe.

Colchester held league leaders Crewe Alexandra to a 0–0 draw at Gresty Road on 22 October, but had the chance to win the game from the penalty spot in the seventh minute of stoppage time. However, Crewe goalkeeper Will Jääskeläinen saved Frank Nouble's effort after U's forward Theo Robinson had been sent off in an off the ball incident after the penalty had been awarded.

Colchester returned to winning ways on 26 October for the first time in three weeks with a 3–1 home win against Newport County. The visitors were in front after just five minutes, but first-half goals from Ryan Jackson and Ben Stevenson put the U's in control. A goal from Courtney Senior 15 minutes from the full-time whistle rounded off the victory for Colchester.

On 29 October, Colchester reached the quarter-final of the League Cup for only the second time in the club's history, coming from behind to win 3–1 for the second time in three days. Crawley were the hosts and opened the scoring on 20-minutes, but a Luke Norris header two minutes later levelled the score. In the second-half, Colchester went ahead after Cohen Bramall's free kick hit the bar, struck Crawley goalkeeper Michael Luyambula and went in. Substitute and former-Crawley loanee Luke Gambin sealed victory in the 79th-minute, his first goal for the U's.

November
Colchester travelled to Mansfield Town on 2 November where they won 3–2. The U's took an eighth-minute lead through Brandon Comley, but Mansfield equalised on the stroke of half-time. Courtney Senior reinstated Colchester's lead on 74-minutes, before Luke Gambin scored his second in as many games three minutes from full-time to secure victory. In the 90th-minute, Omari Sterling-James pulled a goal back for the home side.

On 8 November, Cameron James joined National League South side Maidstone United on loan for a month.

Colchester suffered defeat in the FA Cup first round for the fourth consecutive season when they lost 2–0 to League One side Coventry City on 9 November.

U's youngsters Luke Ige and Ollie Sims were loaned out to Witham Town and Bowers & Pitsea respectively on initial 28-day contracts.

On 12 November, Colchester played their final group game in the EFL Trophy. They faced Ipswich Town and won 1–0 with a first senior goal from Ryan Clampin, topping the group in the process.

Colchester were held to a 1–1 draw at Cheltenham Town on 23 November. Luke Norris scored his fifth league goal of the season to hand the visitors the lead, but in the second-half, Dean Gerken fouled Reuben Reid in the penalty area and Conor Thomas converted to equalise.

December
On 3 December, Colchester were defeated in the second round of the EFL Trophy at home to Stevenage in front of a crowd of just 959. Stevenage led 2–0 after half an hour of play, but the home side pulled a goal back in the second-half from a Chris Stokes own goal.

Teenage midfielder Kwame Poku, who had only joined Colchester in the summer of 2019, signed a new -year contract extension with the club on 5 December to keep him with the U's until summer 2022.

On 7 December, Colchester earned their first win in almost a month with a 93rd-minute winner against Salford City in the first-ever meeting between the two clubs. Harry Pell scored his first goal of the season with an injury time header.

Midfielder Diaz Wright joined National League side Dagenham & Redbridge on loan until 6 January 2020. Also leaving the club on loan was fellow midfielder Tyrique Hyde, who joined Dartford in the National League South for one month.

After falling behind by two goals in their League Two game at Scunthorpe United on 14 December, Colchester battled back in the second half to claim a 2–2 draw. Former Colchester loanee Abo Eisa scored late in the first half for the home side, then Kevin van Veen doubled Scunthorpe's advantage two minutes into the second half. Luke Norris scored to reduced the deficit just before the hour mark, and Luke Prosser scored his second of the season four minutes later to earn a point for the U's.

Colchester travelled to Old Trafford for the first time in their history to face Manchester United in the EFL Cup quarter-final. The visitors held their Premier League opposition in the first half, going in to the interval at 0–0. In the second half, it took Marcus Rashford six minutes to open the scoring, and five minutes later, Ryan Jackson scored an own goal to double United's lead. Anthony Martial added a third on 61-minutes to complete the scoring.

Colchester continued their good run of league form with a commanding 3–0 win over Carlisle United at the Community Stadium on 21 December. Nathaniel Knight-Percival's own goal in the 26th-minute put the U's 1–0 up and Callum Harriott's first goal since his return to the club doubled Colchester's advantage in the 41st-minute. In the second half, Cohen Bramall registered his first goal in the English Football League with a well taken free kick seven minutes after the restart to seal the victory.

In the early League Two kickoff on Boxing Day, Colchester beat Leyton Orient 3–1 at Brisbane Road to move up to fourth in the table. Theo Robinson gave the U's a 1–0 lead after 41-minutes, then Harry Pell doubled Colchester's lead in the 64th-minute. Orient pulled a goal back four minutes from time, but Robinson added a second for himself and scored Colchester's third goal in the 91st-minute.

Fourth-placed Colchester hosted second-placed Exeter City in their final game of 2019 on 29 December. The visitors took an eighth-minute lead through Jake Taylor, but Harry Pell levelled the score after 16-minutes to earn his second goal in as many games. After the break, Theo Robinson put the U's in front with his third goal in two games. Tom Lapslie was sent off for a foul in the penalty area and denying a goalscoring opportunity, a penalty which substitute Ryan Bowman converted. Colchester held on with ten men to draw 2–2.

January
Colchester maintained their unbeaten run with a 1–1 draw with Crawley on New Year's Day. Frank Nouble's fourth goal of the season in the 64th-minute was later cancelled out by a Luke Prosser own goal.

On 4 January, Jevani Brown left the club to join League Two rivals Forest Green Rovers on loan until the end of the season, having played 17 games for the U's but only five in the league.

Also on 4 January, Colchester were held to a disappointing 0–0 draw against ten-man, bottom of the table Stevenage. Tom Soares had been sent off for the home side in the 19th-minute, but a dominant Colchester couldn't get the ball past Stevenage goalkeeper Paul Farman.

On 6 January, Percy Kiangebeni joined Southern League Premier Division South side Hendon on loan for a month.

On 8 January, Tyrique Hyde extended his loan spell at Dartford for a further month.

On 10 January, both Cameron James and Diaz Wright joined National League South side Welling United on loan for one month.

Colchester were held to a 1–1 draw on 11 January at League Two's bottom club Morecambe. The U's had taken a 35th-minute lead through Frank Nouble, but were pegged back on 69-minutes. Ryan Jackson was then sent off seven minutes from time for a second booking.

On 14 January, Colchester confirmed the signing of Theo Robinson on loan from Southend until the end of the season.

On 18 January, Plymouth Argyle defender Tafari Moore joined Colchester on loan until the end of the season. He went straight into the U's squad to face Macclesfield Town the same day. Later that day, Moore played 60-minutes as Colchester ended a streak of four consecutive draws to record a 2–1 victory. Callum Harriott opened the scoring after 14-minutes, before the lead was doubled following a Fiacre Kelleher own goal. The visitors reduced the deficit in the second half but the U's held on to extend their unbeaten run to 13 games.

Colchester were held to a 0–0 draw at home by Bradford City on 21 January. Their game in hand to clubs around them meant they moved back into the play-off places.

On 25 January, midfielder Louis Dunne joined Southern League Premier Division South side Farnborough on loan until the end of February.

Colchester moved up to fifth in the League Two table with a 0–0 draw at second-placed Exeter City on 25 January to record their sixth draw in seven games.

The U's hosted league leaders Swindon Town on 28 January. The visitors took the lead three minutes after half-time, but Luke Norris scored against his old club to level the score on 74-minutes. 15 minutes later and Colchester had taken a 3–1 lead following a Theo Robinson brace in the 85th and 89th-minutes. The match finished 3–1 to the U's as they recorded their third victory of the season against Swindon.

February
Colchester's unbeaten run, stretching back to October, was finally ended on 1 February to managerless Cambridge United. Similar to Colchester's August home defeat to Cambridge, Luke Norris had given the U's the lead, but two goals within the space of 70 seconds late in the second half ended their 16-game streak.

On 5 February, the club announced the departure of Junior Ogedi-Uzokwe to Israeli Premier League side Hapoel Hadera on a permanent contract.

The U's bounced back from their defeat to Cambridge in impressive style, beating Plymouth Argyle 3–0 on 8 February. Argyle had started the day in the automatic promotion positions, but three first-half goals sealed victory for the home side. Ben Stevenson opened the scoring for Colchester after 14-minutes, then Theo Robinson headed in his tenth goal of the season on the half-hour mark. Six minutes later, he earned himself a brace to record a convincing victory.

On 11 February, Colchester were beaten at home by Grimsby Town. After taking the lead through captain Luke Prosser after 17-minutes, Charles Vernam scored for the away side four minutes later. The U's retook the lead three minutes before half time with Theo Robinson's twelfth goal for the club. However, Vernam scored two goals in the space of three second-half minutes to snatch a victory for Grimsby.

Colchester fell to their heaviest league defeat of the season on 15 February when they were beaten 3–0 at Port Vale.

After leaving league rivals Macclesfield Town in January, defender Miles Welch-Hayes on 21 February on a free transfer. He signed a contract until summer 2022.

On 23 February, Colchester won their first match in three games with a 2–1 victory at Salford City. Kwame Poku's solo effort put the U's ahead, before Callum Harriott doubled the advantage after 41-minutes. Two minutes later, the home side pulled a goal back through Ashley Hunter, but the visitors held on for the win.

On 29 February, Colchester dropped out of the play-off places and had Omar Sowunmi sent off as they fell to a 2–0 home defeat to Cheltenham Town.

Season postponement
Colchester made a quick return to the play-off positions with a convincing 3–0 away win at Carlisle United on 7 March. Kwame Poku opened the scoring for the U's on 41-minutes, and the lead was doubled by Luke Norris two minutes later. Poku then earned himself a brace in the 59th-minute.

On 13 March, the EFL suspended the season until 3 April at the earliest in light of the COVID-19 pandemic.

On 3 April, the EFL provided an update to the postponement of the season by suspending all football indefinitely until matches were safe to resume.

On 27 April, two days after they were scheduled to have played their final game of the 2019–20 season, Colchester United became the first English Football League team to announce the release of first-team players in light of the COVID-19 pandemic. Chairman Robbie Cowling announced that four first-team players, namely Brandon Comley, Ryan Jackson, Frank Nouble, and club captain Luke Prosser, would not be offered new deals once their contracts expired at the end of June. This was despite the fact that Cowling admitted under normal circumstances he "would have been determined to re-sign".

The following day, the club released a list of twelve further players who would not be offered new deals on the expiry of their current contracts. These included Dean Ager, Callum Anderson, Jamal Campbell-Ryce, Louis Dunne, Chandler Hallett, Tyrique Hyde, Luke Ige, Tariq Issa, Cameron James, Callum Jones, Percy Kiangebeni, and Bailey Vose.

On 9 June, League Two clubs voted in favour of ending the season with immediate effect. As Colchester were placed sixth in the League Two table, they were confirmed a play-off place, with the U's set to face Exeter City in the semi-finals.

Colchester played their play-off semi-final first leg at an empty Colchester Community Stadium on 18 June. The hosts won the tie 1–0 through a Cohen Bramall free-kick late in the second-half.

In the play-off semi-final second leg on 22 June, Colchester were beaten 3–1 after extra time, with Exeter heading to the Wembley final with a 3–2 aggregate victory. The hosts had taken an early lead, before taking control of the tie with a second goal just before the hour mark. Courtney Senior levelled the score on aggregate 2–1 after 78-minutes, before the tie went to extra time. With nine minutes remaining, Exeter scored again to progress to the final and spelt another season in League Two for the U's.

Players

Transfers and contracts

In

Out

Loans in

Loans out

Contracts
New contracts and contract extensions.

Match details

Preseason friendlies
Colchester United announced four pre-season fixtures on 24 May with games lined up at Dulwich Hamlet, Wealdstone and Dover Athletic, and a home fixture against Ipswich Town. A further fixture was added on 5 June with a game against Bowers & Pitsea, and then on 10 June, Charlton Athletic were named as Colchester's sixth pre-season opponents. Colchester scheduled a friendly against Welsh Premier League side Cefn Druids during pre-season trip to Wales for 13 July.

League Two

Results round by round

League table

Matches
On 20 June 2019, the EFL League Two fixtures were revealed.

Play-offs

FA Cup

The first round draw was made on 21 October 2019.

EFL Cup

The first round draw was made on 20 June. The second round draw was made on 13 August 2019 following the conclusion of all but one first round matches. The third round draw was confirmed on 28 August 2019, live on Sky Sports. The draw for the fourth round was made on 25 September 2019. The quarter-final draw was conducted on 31 October, live on BBC Radio 2.

EFL Trophy

On 9 July 2019, the pre-determined group stage draw was announced with Invited clubs to be drawn on 12 July 2019. The draw for the second round was made on 16 November 2019 live on Sky Sports.

Squad statistics

Appearances and goals

|-
!colspan="16"|Players who appeared for Colchester who left during the season

|}

Goalscorers

Disciplinary record

Player debuts
Players making their first-team Colchester United debut in a fully competitive match.

Honours and awards

End-of-season awards

See also
List of Colchester United F.C. seasons

References

2019-20
2019–20 EFL League Two by team